is a railway station in the city of Sanjō, Niigata, Japan, operated by East Japan Railway Company (JR East).

Lines
Obiori Station is served by the Shin'etsu Main Line and is 88.5 kilometers from the terminus of the line at Naoetsu Station.

Station layout
The station consists of two ground-level opposed side platforms connected by a footbridge, serving two tracks. The station is unattended.

Platforms

History
Obiori Station opened on 16 June 1898. With the privatization of Japanese National Railways (JNR) on 1 April 1987, the station came under the control of JR East. A new station building was completed in 1992.

Surrounding area
Obiori Post Office

See also
 List of railway stations in Japan

References

External links

 JR East station information 

Railway stations in Niigata Prefecture
Railway stations in Japan opened in 1898
Shin'etsu Main Line
Stations of East Japan Railway Company
Sanjō, Niigata